The 2008 Montana Grizzlies football team represented the University of Montana during the 2008 NCAA Division I FCS football season. Montana competed as a member of the Big Sky Conference and played their home games at the Washington–Grizzly Stadium.

The Grizzlies were led by sixth-year head coach Bobby Hauck. Montana finished the regular season with an 11–1 overall record and a 7–1 record in conference play to win a share of their 11th straight Big Sky title. Montana secured a berth in the FCS playoffs where they defeated Texas State, Weber State, and James Madison in succession to advance to the championship game. There, they were defeated by Richmond, 24–7, to finish the season as the national championship runners-up.

Schedule

References

Montana
Montana Grizzlies football seasons
Big Sky Conference football champion seasons
Montana Grizzlies football